State Route 513 (SR 513) is a north–south state highway in the eastern portion of Ohio, a U.S. state. The southern terminus of State Route 513 is at State Route 146 in Summerfield.

Route description

This state highway passes through the northeastern quadrant of Noble County and the eastern portion of Guernsey County.  State Route 513 is not included as a part of the National Highway System.

History
State Route 513 first appeared in 1937 along the alignment that it currently follows between State Route 146 and U.S. Route 22.  It has not experienced any major changes in its routing since its inception.

Major intersections

References

External links

513
Transportation in Noble County, Ohio
Transportation in Guernsey County, Ohio